Tony Kakkar (born 9 April 1984) is an Indian singer known for his cringe pop songs. Kakkar made his debut in Bollywood in 2012, as a music director with the film Mr. Bhatti on Chutti, for which he composed the song "Good Boys Bad Boys". He is the brother of singers Sonu Kakkar and Neha Kakkar. In 2014, he founded Desi Music Factory, a record label along with Anshul Garg.

Life and career
Kakkar has two sisters, Sonu Kakkar and Neha Kakkar. Both of them are singers in the industry. Hailing from Rishikesh, their family moved to Delhi in 1990s, where the siblings used to sing at jagratas. In 2004, Kakkar and his sister Neha shifted to Mumbai. In Mumbai, he started learning the technical aspects of composing music. During this time, he also worked as a lyricist for composer Sandeep Chowta. He composed the song "Sawan Aaya Hai" for the film Creature 3D. In 2015, he founded the record label Desi Music Factory together with Anshul Garg.

Plagiarism allegations
Kakkar has been criticised and accused of copying visuals from K-pop songs on several occasions. The visuals for "Shona Shona," which was released in 2020, are similar to B1A4's "Like A Movie" and IZ*ONE's "Beware". "Booty Shake", released in 2021, is also heavily based on a K-pop song. The music video is being alleged to be similar to K-pop girl group Blackpink's music video called "Ice Cream".

Television
2020 - Taare Zameen Par as mentor along with Shankar Mahadevan and Jonita Gandhi.

Filmography

Album

References

External links 
 
 

1984 births
Indian male singers
Living people
Bollywood playback singers
Indian male pop singers